Colombo Cricket Club Ground (CCCG;) is a multi-purpose stadium in Colombo, Sri Lanka. It is currently used mostly for domestic first-class cricket matches and for hosting warm up matches for touring teams. The stadium can hold 6,000 people and hosted its first Test match in 1984. It is one of the smallest test grounds in the world. Three Test matches have been held at the Colombo Cricket Club Ground.

Ground
The Colombo Cricket Club Ground is the home ground of the Colombo Cricket Club, the oldest first-class cricket club in Sri Lanka. The Ground is one of the three cricket grounds located in Maitland Crescent, Colombo, the other two being the Sinhalese Sports Club Ground and the Nondescripts Cricket Club Ground. It is one of the smaller cricket grounds in Sri Lanka, and is also one of the smallest Test cricket grounds in the world. The Colombo Cricket Club Ground was formerly known as the Maitland Crescent Ground.

The playing area of the ground takes up most of the space with a narrow area available for spectators to be seated on each side. On one end of the ground is the scoreboard and a concrete stand that houses the press box. This end is known as the Press Box End. The other end is the Pavilion End, where the main pavilion is located. The ground can hold 6,000 spectators.

Matches held
The first cricket match on the Colombo Cricket Club Ground was held during the 1911-12 season. Its maiden first-class cricket match was held in 1927 when the Europeans (Ceylon) hosted the Marylebone Cricket Club. The ground also hosted a Marylebone Cricket Club team captained by Douglas Jardine in 1933-34.

Three Test matches have been played at the Colombo Cricket Club Ground. The first was held in March 1984, between Sri Lanka and New Zealand, resulting in a win for New Zealand by an innings and 61 runs. Another Test match was held between Sri Lanka and Pakistan in March 1986. The last Test at the ground was in April 1987, again between Sri Lanka and New Zealand.

At the ground in 1973-74, Sri Lanka played its first two international List A matches, against India. India won both matches.

Domestic first-class and List A matches are regularly played at the ground. It also hosts touring teams in warm-up matches. The ground was one of the five venues for the 2006 under-19 Cricket World Cup.

International centuries
There are four Test centuries have been scored at the venue.

List of five-wicket hauls
Five five-wicket hauls in Test matches have been taken at the venue.

See also
List of Test cricket grounds

References

Cricket grounds in Colombo
Multi-purpose stadiums in Sri Lanka
Test cricket grounds in Sri Lanka